Karim Khan Sadiq (born 28 February 1984) is an Afghan cricketer. He is a right-handed batsman who occasionally fields as a wicket-keeper for the Afghan national team. He can also bowl off break, taking 4/27 against Denmark in their first match of 2009 ICC World Cup Qualifier.

Early career
Saadiq is a part of the rapidly rising Afghan cricket team that in under a year has won the World Cricket League Division Five, Division Four and Division Three, thus promoting them to Division Two and allowing them to partake in the 2009 ICC World Cup Qualifier's.

He was suspended for one match during the 2009 ICC World Cup Qualifier due to "inappropriate and intentional physical contact" in their defeat to the Netherlands. During the tournament he performed well with the bat, top scoring with 92, and, surprisingly for a wicketkeeper, with the ball.

Quitting Afghanistan
Shortly after Afghanistan achieved ODI status, Sadiq quit the national setup in protest at his brother, Hasti Gul being dropped for their ICC Intercontinental Cup match against Zimbabwe XI. Sadiq cited what he called "injustices" and "wrong policies", accusing national coach Kabir Khan of not acting in the best interest of the team.

Return
Sadiq's international retirement was short lived, as he made his first-class debut in January 2010 against Ireland, where he made scores of 19 and 1.

In February 2010, Sadiq made his Twenty20 International debut in the Sri Lanka Associates T20 Series against Ireland. Sadiq took 2/17 with the ball, despite this Afghanistan lost by 5 wickets. Later, Sadiq was a key member of Afghanistan's World Twenty20 Qualifier winning team. Sadiq was later named in Afghanistan's squad for the 2010 ICC World Twenty20.

Sadiq was a key member of Afghanistan's 2010 ACC Trophy Elite winning squad, which defeated Nepal in the final by 95 runs. In final, Sadiq top scored for Afghanistan with 58 runs. In Afghanistan's first match of the tournament, he scored 130 runs from 92 balls against Bhutan in Afghanistan's 393 run win.

He later played for the newly formed Afghan Cheetahs team in the Faysal Bank Twenty-20 Cup 2011-12. Sadiq later featured in Afghanistan's first One Day International against a Full Member Test-playing nation when they played Pakistan at Sharjah Cricket Association Stadium in February 2012. Sadiq top scored in Afghanistan's innings with 40 runs, before becoming one of Shahid Afridi's five wickets. Pakistan won the encounter by 7 wickets.

In September 2018, he was named in Kandahar's squad in the first edition of the Afghanistan Premier League tournament.

References

External links

1984 births
Living people
Afghan cricketers
Pashtun people
Afghanistan One Day International cricketers
Afghanistan Twenty20 International cricketers
Cricketers from Nangarhar Province
Afghan expatriates in Pakistan
Asian Games silver medalists for Afghanistan
Asian Games medalists in cricket
Cricketers at the 2010 Asian Games
Cricketers at the 2014 Asian Games
Afghan Cheetahs cricketers
Afghan cricket captains
Medalists at the 2010 Asian Games
Medalists at the 2014 Asian Games
Boost Defenders cricketers
Kandahar Knights cricketers
Wicket-keepers